Xinzhai is a Bronze Age archaeological site in Henan, China.

Xinzhai may also refer to a number of locations in China:

Towns
Written as "新宅镇":
Xinzhai, Wuyi County, Zhejiang, in Wuyi County, Zhejiang

Written as "辛寨镇":
Xinzhai, Linqu County, in Linqu County, Shandong
Xinzhai, Yucheng, Shandong, in Yucheng City, Shandong

Written as "新寨镇":
Xinzhai, Weiyuan County, Gansu, in Weiyuan County, Gansu
Xinzhai, Laoting County, Hebei

Townships
Written as "辛寨乡":
Xinzhai Township, Zhangqiu, in Zhangqiu City, Shandong

Written as "新寨乡":
Xinzhai Township, Tanchang County, in Tanchang County, Gansu
Xinzhai Township, Changshun County, in Changshun County, Guizhou
Xinzhai Township, Yinjiang County, in Yinjiang Tujia and Miao Autonomous County, Guizhou
Xinzhai Township, Wuzhai County, in Wuzhai County, Shanxi

Villages

Written as "新寨村":
Xinzhai, Mengla County, Yunnan